Evil Power the fourth full album from the band Lair of the Minotaur was announced in February 2010 and released on April 13, 2010 under the newly created Grind-House Records, an independent record label to replace their last label Southern Lord Records.

Just like the band's previous album War Metal Battle Master a music video for the title track was made, this time directed by Ryan Oliver of Deathblow Productions.

The track "Let's Kill These Motherfuckers" appeared in the soundtrack of the 2015 New Zealand horror comedy film Deathgasm.

Track listing

 Attack the Gods - 3:39
 Let's Kill These Motherfuckers - 2:42
 Riders of Skullhammer, We Ride the Night - 1:58
 Evil Power - 2:19
 Goatstorm - 1:43
 Hunt and Devour - 1:31
 Metal Titans - 2:04
 Blood From the Witch's Vein - 2:50
 We Are Hades - 4:07
 Death March of the Conquerors - 4:18
 The Violent Iron Age of Man - 3:25

Personnel 
Steven Rathbone - Vocals, guitar and mixing
D.J. Barraca - Bass
Chris Wozniak - Drums

References

2010 albums
Lair of the Minotaur albums